The 2014 general election was held in the U.S. state of Texas on November 4, 2014. All of Texas's executive officers were up for election as well as a United States Senate seat, and all of Texas's thirty-six seats in the United States House of Representatives. Primary elections were held on March 4, 2014. Primary runoffs, required if no candidate wins a majority of the vote, were held on May 27, 2014. Elections were also held for the Texas legislature and proposition 1, seeking funds for Texas highways (which passed).

A combination of retirements, incumbents seeking other offices and a primary defeat means that after the election, for the first time since 1874, all of Texas's executive offices were held by new officeholders.

The Tea Party made large gains in the 2014 elections, with Tea Party-backed candidates being elected into offices such as lieutenant governor and attorney general, among other offices.

Governor

Incumbent Republican Governor Rick Perry, who has served in the office since December 21, 2000, when George W. Bush resigned ahead of being sworn in as President of the United States, has announced that he will not run for a fourth full term as governor. This will be the first open election for governor since 1990, when Ann Richards was elected.

Greg Abbott won the Republican primary, Wendy Davis won the Democratic primary. Kathie Glass won the Libertarian Party of Texas nomination in convention. They and a Green candidate will contest the general election.

Abbott won the general election, defeating Davis by twenty points.

Lieutenant Governor
Incumbent Republican Lieutenant Governor David Dewhurst ran for re-election to an unprecedented fourth term in office.

Republican primary

Candidates
Declared
 David Dewhurst, incumbent lieutenant governor
 Dan Patrick, state senator
 Jerry E. Patterson, Commissioner of the General Land Office
 Todd Staples, Commissioner of Agriculture

Declined
 Susan Combs, Comptroller of Public Accounts

Polling

Results

Runoff
Polling

Results

Democratic primary

Candidates
Declared
 Leticia Van de Putte, state senator

Withdrew
 Maria Luisa Alvarado, retired United States Air Force master sergeant and nominee for lieutenant governor in 2006

Libertarian nomination

Candidates
Declared
 Brandon de Hoyos, journalist

Withdrew
 Ed Kless, businessman

Green nomination

Candidates
Declared
 Chandra Courtney

General election

Polling

Results

Attorney General
Incumbent Republican Attorney General Greg Abbott did not run for re-election to a fourth term. He was instead the Republican nominee for governor.

Republican primary

Candidates
Declared
 Dan Branch, state representative
 Ken Paxton, state senator
 Barry Smitherman, chairman of the Railroad Commission of Texas

Declined
 Greg Abbott, Texas Attorney General

Polling

Results

Runoff
Results

Democratic primary

Candidates
Declared
 Sam Houston, attorney and nominee for Texas Supreme Court Justice Place 7 in 2008

Libertarian nomination

Candidates
Declared
 Jamie Balagia (In 2019, Balagia was found guilty of defrauding Colombian drug traffickers thousands of dollars after claiming to be well-connected to U.S. officials who could dismiss the drug trafficking cases if the Colombians paid money).
 Tom Glass, Vice Chair of the Libertarian Party of Texas

Balagia won the Libertarian nomination

Green nomination

Candidates
Declared
 Jamar Osborne

General election

Polling

Results

Comptroller of Public Accounts
Incumbent Republican Comptroller Susan Combs retired and did not seek a third term in office.

Republican primary

Candidates
Declared
 Glenn Hegar, state senator
 Harvey Hilderbran, state representative
 Debra Medina, activist and candidate for governor in 2010
 Raul Torres, former state representative

Declined
 Susan Combs, Comptroller of Public Accounts

Polling

Results

A runoff was to be held, but with Hegar only narrowly below the 50% threshold and with several thousand provisional and overseas ballots to be counted, Hildebran withdrew on March 7, 2014, and endorsed Hegar. When the final results were released, Hegar had come only 50 votes short of winning the primary outright.

Democratic primary

Candidates
Declared
 Mike Collier, businessman and accountant

Libertarian nomination

Candidates
Declared
 Ben Sanders

Green nomination

Candidates
Declared
 Deb Shafto, nominee for Governor in 2010

General election

Polling

Results

Commissioner of the General Land Office
Incumbent Republican Commissioner Jerry E. Patterson did not run for re-election to a fourth term. He instead ran unsuccessfully for lieutenant governor.

Republican primary

Candidates
Declared
 George P. Bush, attorney, U.S. Navy Reserve officer and son of former Governor of Florida Jeb Bush
 David Watts, businessman, author, preacher and flight instructor

Declined
 Jerry E. Patterson, Commissioner of the General Land Office

Results

Democratic primary

Candidates
Declared
 John Cook, former Mayor of El Paso

Libertarian nomination

Candidates
Declared
 Steven Childs
 Justin Knight

Withdrew
 Ed Tidwell, Lago Vista City Councilman

Knight won the Libertarian nomination

Green nomination

Candidates
Declared
 Ulises Cabrera

General election

Polling

Results

Commissioner of Agriculture
Incumbent Republican Commissioner Todd Staples did not run for re-election to a third term. He instead ran unsuccessfully for lieutenant governor. On September 18, he announced that he would resign within the next two months, to become President of the Texas Oil and Gas Association.

Republican primary

Candidates
Declared
 J. Allen Carnes, Mayor of Uvalde
 Joe Cotten, candidate for Railroad Commission of Texas in 2012
 Tommy Merritt, former state representative
 Sid Miller, former state representative
 Eric Opiela, attorney, rancher and former executive director of the Republican Party of Texas

Withdrew
 Brandon Creighton, state representative (running for the State Senate)

Declined
 Todd Staples, Commissioner of Agriculture

Results

Runoff
Results

Democratic primary

Candidates
Declared
 Hugh Fitzsimons, rancher and former member of the Winter Garden Water Conservation District
 Kinky Friedman, singer, songwriter, novelist, humorist and Independent candidate for Governor in 2006
 Jim Hogan, farmer and insurance agent

Results

Runoff
Results

Libertarian nomination

Candidates
Declared
 Rick Donaldson
 David "Rocky" Palmquist, rancher

Palmquist won the Libertarian nomination.

Green nomination

Candidates
Declared
 Kenneth Kendrick, food safety advocate and whistleblower

General election

Polling

Results

Railroad Commissioner
Incumbent Republican Commissioner Barry Smitherman did not run for re-election to a full term. He instead ran unsuccessfully for attorney general.

Republican primary

Candidates
Declared
 Becky Berger, geologist and candidate for the Railroad Commission in 2012
 Malachi Boyuls, attorney and venture capitalist
 Wayne Christian, former state representative
 Ryan Sitton, oil and gas engineer and candidate for the Texas House of Representatives in 2012

Withdrew
 Stefani Carter, state representative (running for re-election)
 Ray Keller, former state representative
 Joe Pool, Jr., candidate for Texas Supreme Court Justice Place 4 in 2012 and son of former U.S. Representative Joe R. Pool

Declined
 Barry Smitherman, Chairman of the Railroad Commission of Texas

Results

Runoff
Results

Democratic primary

Candidates
Declared
 Steve Brown, former Chairman of the Fort Bend County Democratic Party
 Dale Henry, perennial candidate

Results

Libertarian nomination

Candidates
Declared
 Jason Kute
 Mark Miller, businessman

Miller won the Libertarian nomination.

Green nomination

Candidates
Declared
 Martina Salinas

General election

Polling

Results

Texas Legislature

Every seat in the Texas House of Representatives and about half of the seats in the Texas Senate were up for election.

Texas House of Representatives

Texas Senate

United States Senate

Incumbent Republican Senator and Senate Minority Whip John Cornyn ran for re-election to a third term. He won the Republican primary with 59% of the vote, easily turning back a primary challenge from U.S. Representative Steve Stockman and six others. The Democratic primary went to a runoff after businessman David Alameel took 47% of the vote and Worldwide LaRouche Youth Movement activist Kesha Rogers took 22% of the vote. Alameel won the runoff.

In the general election, Cornyn defeated Alameel 61.6%–34.4%.

United States House of Representatives

All of Texas's thirty-six seats in the United States House of Representatives were up for election in 2014.

References

 
Texas